HC Empor Rostock  is a team handball club from Rostock, Germany.

Empor Rostock was one of the most successful team handball clubs of the GDR.

Crest, colours, supporters

Kits

Current squad

Honours

Men
 10x Champion
 Indoor Handball: 1953, 1954, 1956, 1957, 1968, 1973, 1978, 1986, 1987
 Field Handball: 1955
 9x Vice Champion
 Indoor Handball: 1970, 1980, 1981, 1982
 Field Handball: 1948, 1949, 1950, 1953, 1958
 7x Cup Winner
 1980, 1981, 1985, 1986, 1987, 1988, 1989
 Champion's League Finalist   1979
 Cup Winner's Cup  1982
 Cup Winner's Cup Finalist  1983
 European Club Championship  1982
 Team of the Year (GDR)  1961
 Bundesliga  1991-1993

Women
 6x Champion
Indoor Handball: 1966, 1967, 1989
Field Handball: 1964, 1965, 1966

External links
Official website

German handball clubs
Sport in Rostock